Evert Ferreira (born 29 April 1976) is a South African cricketer. He played in 18 first-class and 27 List A matches for Boland and Border from 1996/97 to 2000/01.

References

External links
 

1976 births
Living people
South African cricketers
Boland cricketers
Border cricketers
Cricketers from Pretoria